Ruda nad Moravou is a municipality and village in Šumperk District in the Olomouc Region of the Czech Republic. It has about 2,500 inhabitants.

Administrative parts
Villages of Bartoňov, Radomilov, Hrabenov, Hostice and Štědrákova Lhota are administrative parts of Ruda nad Moravou.

Etymology
The origin of the name is connected with iron ore mining; ruda means "ore" in Czech. The name appeared first in Latin as Ferreus Mons and in German as Eisenberg, both meaning "iron mountain". From 1880, the municipality is named Ruda nad Moravou, literally "Ore above the Morava (river)" to distinguish from other places with the same name.

Geography
The Morava River flows through the municipality. The built-up area around the Morava is located mainly in the Mohelnice Depression lowlands. Rest of the territory is located in the Hanušovice Highlands.

History

The first written mention of Ruda nad Moravou is from 1350. A church and parish were already there and the iron ore was mined. Until 1397, it was probably a part of the Zábřeh estate owned by the Sternberg family. From 1397 to 1447, it was owned by lords of Kravaře, who laid the foundation of an independent estate. Ruda was owned by the Tunkl of Brníčko family in 1447–1508, by Mikuláš Trčka of Lípa in 1508–1512, and by lords of Boskovice in 1512–1596.

In 1596, Ruda was separated from the Zábřeh estate and sold to the Zierotin family. Lord Bernard of Zierotin had built a Renaissance castle here in 1610. After the Battle of White Mountain, the properties of the Zierotins were confiscated and Ruda was acquired by the House of Liechtenstein. The village was then heavily stroke by events of Thirty Years' War. The Liechtensteins owned it until 1848.

In 1896, the municipality was divided to two parts, the Czech Horní Ruda ("Upper Ruda") and the Sudeten German Dolní Ruda ("Lower Ruda"). This two municipalities were united again in 1920. The German population was expelled after World War II.

In 1960, the village of Hostice was joined to Ruda nad Moravou. In 1980, Hrabenov was joined.

Demographics

Economy
A significant company located in Ruda nad Moravou is Lesy Ruda a.s. that harvest wood in nearby forests.

Transport
Ruda nad Moravou lies on the railway lines Hanušovice–Šumperk and Jeseník–Zábřeh. There are two railway stops, Ruda nad Moravou and Bartoňov. The municipality is also served by several bus lines.

Sights

The most valuable monument is the Renaissance castle. Today it is privately owned and gradually reconstructed.

The Church of Saint Lawrence is the landmark of the village. The current structure was built in 1784–1806.

An architecturally valuable Empire building of a distillery from the first half of the 19th century has been preserved. There is also an Empire house from 1818.

On the Háj Hill there is an eponymous observation tower.

Twin towns – sister cities

Ruda nad Moravou is twinned with:
 Kanianka, Slovakia

References

External links

Villages in Šumperk District